Moshood Kabiru (born 8 March 1998 in Isheri-Idimu, Lagos) is a Nigerian football player who currently plays in the Nigeria National League. He was signed by a Nigeria National League team known as Ikorodu United F.C. in the second division league and got the team promoted into the Nigeria Premier League in 2015/2016 season where he made his debut in the Nigeria Premier League.

Career
Kabiru started his professional football career with Ikorodu United F.C.  in 2014 then got the promoted into Nigeria Premier League in 2015. He has received interest from top Nigeria Premier League teams since he joined Ikorodu United F.C. . He was invited to the Nigeria U-23 in 2016 but was unable to make the Nigeria Dream Team to the Olympic

References

 – Video highlight 1
 – Video highlight 2

1998 births
Living people
Nigerian footballers
Nigeria Professional Football League players
Association football defenders
Nigerian expatriate footballers
Expatriate footballers in Nigeria
Ikorodu United F.C. players
Karamone F.C. players
Yoruba sportspeople